The 1885 Ottawa Hockey Club season was the club's second of play. The club played in the Montreal tournament.

Team business
The club moved its practices to the new Dey's Skating Rink, which was electrically lit. The club adopted the colours of gold and blue for their uniforms. Frank Jenkins was selected Captain for the season.

Season
The club played in the Montreal Winter Carnival Tournament. Games were held at the Crystal Rink. William O'Dell was goaltender, replacing Albert Low, who was on a survey exhibition. Ottawa placed second to the Montreal Hockey Club.

Roster
G. Currier, Thomas D. Green, Thomas Gallagher, F.M.S. (Frank) Jenkins(captain), Jack Kerr, Halder Kirby, William O'Dell(goal)

References

 

Ottawa Senators (original) seasons
Ottawa